The 1982–83 season was the 27th season of the Liga Española de Baloncesto. FC Barcelona won their title.

Teams and venues

Team Standings

Title match
The title match was played at the Palacio de Deportes in Oviedo.

|}

Stats Leaders

Points

Notes
1. The title was decided in a match between Barcelona and Real Madrid.
2. Inmobanco was dissolved at the end of the season.
3. Obradoiro was docked 1 point.

References

ACB.com 
Linguasport 

Liga Española de Baloncesto (1957–1983) seasons
 
Spanish